Patrick Anthony Jennings  (born 12 June 1945) is a Northern Irish former professional footballer who played as a goalkeeper. He played 119 international matches for Northern Ireland in an international career which lasted for over 22 years. During his career, Jennings played for Newry Town, Watford and in the top division with Tottenham Hotspur and Arsenal, winning the FA Cup with both of the north London rivals. In total, Jennings made over 1,000 top level appearances, and despite being a goalkeeper he scored in the 1967 FA Charity Shield.

Club career

Newry Town & Watford 
After playing for Shamrock Rovers' under-18 side at the age of 11, Jennings concentrated on Gaelic football until he was sixteen years old, when he made his football comeback with his hometown side Newry Town. After impressing with the team he moved to English Third Division side Watford in May 1963. Jennings again impressed in his first season in England, playing every league game for his club, and making two international appearances that season. He was signed by Tottenham Hotspur for £27,000 in June 1964.

Tottenham Hotspur 
Jennings spent thirteen years at White Hart Lane, where he played in 472 league games for Spurs, and 591 in all competitions. He won the FA Cup in 1967, the League Cup in 1971 and 1973, and the UEFA Cup in 1972. He also scored once, in the 1967 Charity Shield, from his own area, kicking the ball from his hands and sending a large punt down the field that bounced over Manchester United goalkeeper Alex Stepney and into the net. In 1973 the Football Writers' Association named him as its footballer of the year. Three years later he won PFA's version of the award – he was the first goalkeeper to receive this accolade, and to this date remains only one of two, along with Peter Shilton.

Arsenal 
On 6 August 1977, he was transferred to Tottenham's arch-rivals, Arsenal, with Tottenham thinking he was nearing the end of his career. However, Jennings saw off rivals for the goalkeeper's jersey to play for Arsenal for another eight years. Whilst at Highbury, he helped Arsenal to four Cup finals in three successive years; the FA Cup final in 1978, 1979, and 1980, as well as the European Cup Winners Cup final that year. However, Arsenal only managed to win the second of these finals, a 3–2 victory against Manchester United. In total, Jennings made 327 appearances for Arsenal, 237 of them in the League, between 1977 and his eventual retirement from first-team club football in 1985. On 26 February 1983, he became the first player in English football to make 1,000 senior appearances, celebrating this milestone with a clean sheet in a goalless league draw for Arsenal at West Bromwich Albion. Jennings played his last game in the League for Arsenal against Sheffield Wednesday 25 November 1984, and he was finally replaced by John Lukic as the first choice keeper. A Farewell match for Jennings was played against Tottenham Hotspur 8 May 1985 at Highbury.

Later career 
After his retirement, Jennings returned to Tottenham Hotspur, playing mostly in their reserve side to maintain his match sharpness for Northern Ireland's 1986 World Cup campaign. His final appearance for Tottenham was in the Football League Super Cup against Liverpool in January 1986. He was also briefly on Everton's books, having been signed as goalkeeping cover for the 1986 FA Cup Final against Liverpool, Neville Southall having been injured playing for Wales.

International career 

Jennings made his Northern Ireland debut as an eighteen-year-old, whilst playing for Watford. This game, on 15 April 1964, was a British Home Championship match against Wales, Northern Ireland won the game 3–2; George Best made his international debut in the same game. He made five appearances in Northern Ireland’s best-ever performance at the 1982 World Cup, conceding only one goal in the three first group stage games — including a 1-0
win with 10 men against hosts Spain — before letting four past him against eventual group D winners France in the second group stage games.

Despite retiring from club football in 1985, Jennings played his final international game at the 1986 World Cup, on his 41st birthday, making him at the time the World Cup's oldest-ever participant. The match was Northern Ireland's final group game, a 3–0 defeat against Brazil. In total, Jennings participated in the qualifying stages of six World Cups between 1966 and 1986.

Retirement 
Following his retirement Jennings has worked as a goalkeeping coach. He has worked at Tottenham in this capacity since 1993. In 2003 Jennings was inducted into the English Football Hall of Fame in recognition of the skills he demonstrated in the English league. His son, also named Pat, is also a goalkeeper, having played for League of Ireland clubs University College Dublin, Derry City, Shamrock Rovers and NIFL Premiership club Glenavon.

Jennings and his family have lived for many years in Broxbourne, Hertfordshire, where his son attended The Broxbourne School along with the sons of fellow Spurs players Chris Hughton, Osvaldo Ardiles and Ray Clemence. He is still associated with Spurs and hosts Corporate Hospitality fans in the Pat Jennings Lounges at White Hart Lane and Windsor Park, Belfast.

Personal life 
Jennings married Eleanor Toner, a singer from Newry, in 1967. They have four children: Mairead, Siobhan, Ciara and Patrick Junior, a goalkeeper.

Honours 
Jennings was appointed Member of the Order of the British Empire (MBE) for services to association football in the 1976 Birthday Honours; he was promoted to Officer of the same Order (OBE) in the 1987 New Year Honours for services to football, particularly in Northern Ireland, and promoted further to Commander of the Order of the British Empire (CBE) in the 2023 New Year Honours for services to association football and charity.

Club 
Tottenham Hotspur
FA Cup: 1966–67
League Cup: 1970–71, 1972–73
FA Charity Shield: 1967
UEFA Cup: 1971–72

Arsenal
FA Cup: 1978–79

Individual 
 FWA Footballer of the Year: 1972–73
 PFA Players' Player of the Year: 1975–76
 PFA First Division Team of the Year: 1973–74, 1975–76
 FWA Tribute Award: 1986
 Football League 100 Legends: 1998
 English Football Hall of Fame: 2003

See also 
 List of men's footballers with 100 or more international caps
 List of men's footballers with the most official appearances

References

Further reading 
 Jennings, Pat (1983). Pat Jennings: An Autobiography. London, Willow Books, .

External links 

!colspan="3" style="background:#C1D8FF;"| World Cup records
|-

 
 
Pat Jennings, Post War English & Scottish Football League A–Z Player's Database
BBC Archive Collections:Football Legends – Pat Jennings

1945 births
Living people
Arsenal F.C. players
Association football goalkeepers
Sportspeople from Newry
Northern Ireland international footballers
Association footballers from Northern Ireland
Commanders of the Order of the British Empire
Tottenham Hotspur F.C. players
Tottenham Hotspur F.C. non-playing staff
Watford F.C. players
Shamrock Rovers F.C. guest players
1982 FIFA World Cup players
1986 FIFA World Cup players
UEFA Golden Players
FIFA Century Club
English Football Hall of Fame inductees
English Football League players
Down Gaelic footballers
UEFA Cup winning players
FA Cup Final players